Laura Samuel (born 19 February 1991) is a British track and field athlete who competes in the triple jump. She was the silver medallist at the 2014 Commonwealth Games and also the 2010 World Junior Championships in Athletics.

Career
Born in Leicester, she became involved in athletics while at primary school becoming interested after local coaches visited the pupils there. She joined the Leicester Coritanian Athletics Club and later joined Loughborough University's athletics team, when she began studying there.

Initially Samuel focused on short sprinting events, but by 2007 she had begun to focus more on long jump. She won in that discipline at the 2007 English Schools Championships and was runner-up the following year. She won the senior national title in the triple jump in 2010.

Samuel won the British triple jump title indoors and outdoors in 2011, and also made her debut on the IAAF Diamond League circuit, placing seventh at the London Grand Prix. She equalled her personal best in 2012 and repeated as the outdoor UK champion in both 2012 and 2013. She began working with coach Aston Moore of Birchfield Harriers – one of the country's top jumping coaches.

She went unbeaten indoors in 2014, having wins at the London Indoor Games and Botnia Games before taking the British indoor title. At the British Championships outdoors she was beaten into second by Yamilé Aldama, bringing an end to Samuel's four-year streak at the national event. Both were selected to represent England at the 2014 Commonwealth Games. Samuel outdid her older compatriot in the final as Aldama failed to start the competition in Glasgow. Samuel jumped a personal best mark of  – adding over thirty centimetres to her four-year-old personal best. This resulted in her taking a surprise silver medal behind Kimberly Williams of Jamaica. This performance moved her up to third on the all-time British triple jump lists after Ashia Hansen and Aldama.

International competition record

References

External links

Living people
1991 births
Sportspeople from Leicester
British female triple jumpers
English female triple jumpers
Commonwealth Games silver medallists for England
Commonwealth Games medallists in athletics
Athletes (track and field) at the 2014 Commonwealth Games
British Athletics Championships winners
Medallists at the 2014 Commonwealth Games